Bolango is a Philippine language spoken in North-eastern Sulawesi Indonesia. In 1981 it was spoken by some 20,000 people, 5,000 in Bolango and 15,000 in Atinggola.

References

Gorontalo–Mongondow languages
Languages of Sulawesi